The state aviation operator (until 23 February 2021 Aviation Detachment 28) is an agency, subordinated to the Bulgarian government, which provides air transport for the President, Prime Minister and other high-ranking state officials.

History

After World War II, Bulgaria had no civil aviation or airplanes to service senior state administration and implementation of specific government tasks. After the end of the war, the only aircraft in the Bulgarian military, Heinkel He 111 bombers - were converted into passenger use. The need for civil aviation became more obvious in 1946, when the Bulgarian government delegation had to participate in international meetings related to the end of World War II. A Lisunov Li-2 was delivered by the Soviet Union to Bulgaria for use as a transport aircraft. It was assigned to the 16th Transport Air Base in Sofia to be used by the government, and refurbished with a sofa and radio receiver.

In 1956 two new Ilyushin Il-14 were delivered. Meanwhile, almost all governmental flights were executed by planes and crews sent by the USSR for this purpose.

On 23 February 2021, Air Detachment 28 changed its name to "State Aviation Operator".

Fleet
State aviation operator operates 1 Airbus A319, 1 Dassault Falcon 2000, 2 Helicopters Mi-8 and 1 AgustaWestland AW109.

See also
 List of air transports of Heads of State and Government

References

Air transport of heads of state
Aviation in Bulgaria